Type 14 may refer to:
Type 14 Nambu pistol, a Japanese pistol
Blackwood-class frigate, a class of anti-submarine frigates of the Royal Navy
Type 14 10 cm AA Gun, an anti-aircraft gun used by the Imperial Japanese Army
Volkswagen Type 14A (Hebmüller Cabriolet), a German automobile
Peugeot Type 14, a motor car by the French auto-maker Peugeot
Type 14 10 cm Cannon, a cannon of the Imperial Japanese Army
Hiro Type 14 (engine), a water-cooled twelve-cylinder W engine built by the Hiro Naval Arsenal